The Sebaginni were a Gallic tribe dwelling in the middle Durance valley during the Iron Age.

Name 
They are mentioned as Sebaginnos (var. -gninos, Sabagnanos) by Cicero (early 1st c. BC). 

The meaning of the name remains obscure. The first element, seba-, can be compared with the personal names Seboθθu, Sebosus, Sebosiana, and Sebbaudus. The second component, -ginn-, may be Celtic, too.

Geography 
The Sebaginni lived in the middle valley of the Durance river, north of present-day Sisteron (Segustero). Their territory was located south of the Avantici, east of the Vocontii, north of the Sogiontii, and west of the Edenates and Gallitae.

They were probably part of the Vocontian confederation.

References

Bibliography 

Historical Celtic peoples
Gauls
Tribes of pre-Roman Gaul